The 2009 Minneapolis mayoral election was held on November 3, 2009 to elect the Mayor of Minneapolis for a four-year term. Incumbent R. T. Rybak won re-election for a third term in the first round with 73.6% of the vote.

This was the first mayoral election in the city's history to use instant-runoff voting, popularly known as ranked choice voting. Voters had the option of ranking up to three candidates. Municipal elections in Minnesota are nonpartisan, although candidates were able to identify with a political party on the ballot.

Political party endorsements

Results

See also
 2009 Minneapolis municipal elections

References

2009 Minnesota elections
Local elections in Minnesota
Minneapolis